Crumb is an American psychedelic rock band. The group is a collaboration of Brooklyn-based musicians Lila Ramani (guitar, vocals), Jesse Brotter (bass, vocals), Bri Aronow (synthesizers, keyboard, saxophone), and Jonathan Gilad (drums), who met while attending Tufts University.

History 
Ramani, Brotter, Aronow, and Gilad met at Tufts University, often living and playing together until 2016, when they developed and recorded a collection of songs Ramani had started writing in high school and college. The collaboration resulted in the band’s first two EPs, Crumb (2016) and Locket (2017), the latter of which was released, while the band was split between Boston and New York. Both EPs were independently released, with limited vinyl runs and cassettes released by DIY label Citrus City Records.

Crumb went on to release their debut full-length album, Jinx, on June 14, 2019. The album received positive reviews from music critics.

On March 10, 2021, the band released "Trophy", the first single since 2019. The music video was directed by Haoyan of America and features animations by Truba Animation. Their second full-length album Ice Melt was released on April 30, 2021.

Music style 
Indie Current described Crumb's sound on Locket as psychedelic slacker-rock. Paste magazine called their sound a meld of "60s psych, loose jazz, and freeform indie rock into a soothing pop amalgamation." Others[who] described them as psychedelic jazzy lo-fi dream pop.

Discography

Studio albums
 Jinx (2019)
Ice Melt (2021)

EPs
Crumb (2016)
 Locket (2017)

Singles
Trophy (2021)
BNR / Balloon (2021)

References 

Musical groups from Boston
Indie rock musical groups from Massachusetts
Psychedelic rock music groups from Massachusetts
Dream pop musical groups
American jazz-rock groups
Trip hop groups
Musical groups established in 2016